Langbeinites are a family of crystalline substances based on the structure of langbeinite with general formula , where M is a large univalent cation (such as potassium, rubidium, caesium, or ammonium), and M' is a small divalent cation (for example, magnesium, calcium, manganese, iron, cobalt, nickel, copper, zinc or cadmium). The sulfate group, can be substituted by other tetrahedral anions with a double negative charge such as tetrafluoroberyllate, selenate, chromate, molybdate, or tungstates. Although monofluorophosphates are predicted, they have not been described. By redistributing charges other anions with the same shape such as phosphate also form langbeinite structures. In these the M' atom must have a greater charge to balance the extra three negative charges.

At higher temperatures the crystal structure is cubic P213. However, the crystal structure may change to lower symmetries at lower temperatures, for example, P21, P1, or P212121. Usually this temperature is well below room temperature, but in a few cases the substance must be heated to acquire the cubic structure.

Crystal structure
The crystal structures of langbeinites consist of a network of oxygen vertex-connected tetrahedral polyanions (such as sulfate) and distorted metal ion-oxygen octahedra. The unit cell contains four formula units. In the cubic form the tetrahedral anions are slightly rotated from the main crystal axes. When cooled, this rotation disappears and the tetrahedra align, resulting in lower energy as well as lower crystal symmetry.

Examples
Sulfates include dithallium dicadmium sulfate, Dirubidium dicadmium sulfate dipotassium dicadmium sulfate, dithallium manganese sulfate. dirubidium dicalcium trisulfate.

Selenates include diammonium dimanganese selenate. A diammonium dicadmium selenate langbeinite could not be crystallised from water, but a trihydrate exists.

Chromate based langbeinites include dicaesium dimanganese chromate.

Molybdates include . Potassium members are absent, as are zinc and copper containing solids, which all crystallize in different forms. Manganese, magnesium, cadmium and some nickel double molybdates exist as langbeinites.

Double tungstates of the form  are predicted to exist in the langbeinite form.

An examples with tetrafluroberyllate is dipotassium dimanganese tetrafluoroberyllate. Other tetrafluoroberyllates may include: ; ; ; ; ; ; ; ; ; ; ; ; ; ; ; ; ; ; ; ; ; ; ; ; ; ; ; ; ; ; ; ;; ; ; ;
.

The NASICON-type structure competes for these kinds of phosphates, so not all possibilities are langbeinites.
Sodium barium diiron tris-(phosphate) is yet another variation with the same structure but differently charged ions. Most phosphates of this kind of formula do not form langbeinites, instead crystallise in the NASICON structure with archetype .

Properties

Physical properties
Langbeinite crystals can show ferroelectric or ferroelastic properties. Diammonium dicadmium sulfate identified by Jona and Pepinsky with a unit cell size of 10.35 Å becomes ferroelectric when the temperature drops below 95 K. The phase transition temperature is not fixed, and can vary depending on the crystal or history of temperature change. So for example the phase transition in diammonium dicadmium sulfate can occur between 89 and 95 K. Under pressure the highest phase transition temperature increases. ∂T/∂P = 0.0035 degrees/bar. At 824 bars there is a triple point with yet another transition diverging at a slope of ∂T/∂P = 0.103 degrees/bar. For dipotassium dimanganese sulfate pressure causes the transition to rise at the rate of 6.86 °C/kbar. The latent heat of the transition is 456 cal/mol.

Dithallium dicadmium sulfate was shown to be ferroelectric in 1972.

Dipotassium dicadmium sulfate is thermoluminescent with stronger outputs of light at 350 and 475 K. This light output can be boosted forty times with a trace amount of samarium. Dipotassium dimagnesium sulfate doped with dysprosium develops thermoluminescence and mechanoluminescence after being irradiated with gamma rays. Since gamma rays occur naturally, this radiation induced thermoluminescence can be used to date evaporites in which langbeinite can be a constituent.

At higher temperatures the crystals take on cubic form, whereas at the lowest temperatures they can transform to an orthorhombic crystal group. For some types there are two more phases, and as the crystal is cooled it goes from cubic, to monoclinic, to triclinic to orthorhombic. This change to higher symmetry on cooling is very unusual in solids. For some langbeinites only the cubic form is known, but that may be because it has not been studied at low enough temperatures yet. Those that have three phase transitions go through these crystallographic point groups: P213 – P21 – P1 – P212121, whereas the single phase change crystals only have P213 – P212121.

 has a transition temperature above room temperature, so that it is ferroelectric in standard conditions. The orthorhombic cell size is a=10.2082 Å, b=10.2837 Å, c=10.1661 Å.

Where the crystals change phase there is a discontinuity in the heat capacity. The transitions may show thermal hysteresis.

Different cations can be substituted so that for example  and  can form solid solutions for all ratios of thallium and potassium. Properties such as the phase transition temperature and unit cell sizes vary smoothly with the composition.

Langbeinites containing transition metals can be coloured. For example, cobalt langbeinite shows a broad absorption around 555 nm due to the cobalt 4T1g(F)→4T1g(P) electronic transition.

Sulfates

Fluoroberyllates

Phosphates

Phosphate silicates

Mixed anion phosphates

Vanadates
The orthovanadates have four formula per cell, with a slightly distorted cell that has orthorhombic symmetry.

Arsenates

Selenates
Langbeinite structured double selenates are difficult to make, perhaps because selenate ions arranged around the dication leave space for water, so hydrates crystallise from double selenate solutions. For example, when ammonia selenate and cadmium selenate solution is crystallized it forms diammonium dicadmium selenate trihydrate:  and when heated it loses both water and ammonia to form a pyroselenate rather than a langbeinite.

Molybdates

Tungstates

Preparation
Diammonium dicadmium sulfate can be made by evaporating a solution of ammonium sulfate and cadmium sulfate. Dithallium dicadmium sulfate can be made by evaporating a water solution at 85 °C. Other substances may be formed during crystallisation from water such as Tutton's salts or competing compounds like .

Potassium and ammonium nickel langbeinite can be made from nickel sulfate and the other sulfates by evaporating a water solution at 85 °C.

Dipotassium dizinc sulfate can be formed into large crystals by melting zinc sulfate and potassium sulfate together at 753 K. A crystal can be slowly drawn out of the melt from a rotating crucible at about 1.2 mm every hour.

The gel produced was dried out at 95 °C and then baked at various temperatures from 400 to 1100 °C.

Langbeinites crystals can be made by the Bridgman technique, Czochralski process or flux technique.

A Tutton's salt may be heat treated and dehydrate, e.g.  can be made from  heated to 100 °C, forming  as a side product. Similarly the ammonium vanadium Tutton's salt, heated to 160 °C in a closed tube produces . At lower temperatures a hydroxy compound is formed.

Use
Few uses have been made of these substances. Langbeinite itself can be used as an "organic" fertiliser with potassium, magnesium and sulfur, all needed for plant growth. Electrooptic devices could be made from some of these crystals, particularly those that have cubic transition temperatures as temperatures above room temperature. Research continues into this. Ferroelectric crystals could store information in the location of domain walls.

The phosphate langbeinites are insoluble, stable against heat, and can accommodate a large number of different ions, and have been considered for immobilizing unwanted radioactive waste.

Zirconium phosphate langbeinites containing rare earth metals have been investigated for use in white LEDs and plasma displays. Langbeinites that contain bismuth are photoluminescent.
In case of iron-containing ones complex magnetic behavior may be found.

References 

Crystals
Ferroelectric materials

Crystal structure types